Qiu Jian (born June 25, 1975, in Huai'an, Jiangsu) is a male Chinese sports shooter who competed for Team China at the 2008 Summer Olympics.

Major performances
2000/2003 National Championships - 1st 3x40/air rifle 60;
2001 World Cup Final - 1st air rifle 60;
2002 Asian Games - 1st 3x40;
2006 National Champions Tournament - 1st 3x40

Records
1999 National Team Championships - 1770, air rifle (NR);
2000 National Team Championships - 1771, air rifle (NR);
2003 National Team Championships - 3499, 3x40 (NR);

References

1975 births
Living people
Chinese male sport shooters
ISSF rifle shooters
Olympic gold medalists for China
Olympic shooters of China
Sportspeople from Huai'an
Shooters at the 2008 Summer Olympics
Olympic medalists in shooting
Sport shooters from Jiangsu
Medalists at the 2008 Summer Olympics
Asian Games medalists in shooting
Shooters at the 2002 Asian Games
Asian Games gold medalists for China
Asian Games silver medalists for China
Medalists at the 2002 Asian Games
21st-century Chinese people